Carla Molema (born 30 November 1988) is a Dutch former darts player.

Career

In 2007, Molema became the youngest player at the Women's World Darts Championship, aged 18. She lost in the quarter finals to Trina Gulliver. She had previously reached the semi finals of the 2006 Women'ss World Masters, beating Anastasia Dobromyslova in the quarter finals before losing to Karin Krappen. Molema also played in a PDC ranked event, the Thialf Darts Trophy, beating Hermie van Orsouw in the first round before losing to John Lokken.

Molema originally missed out on qualifying for the 2009 Women's World Championship, but after Anastasia Dobromyslova's withdrawal and defection to the PDC, Molema was invited to the event as the highest ranked non-qualifier. She was drawn against Francis Hoenselaar in the quarter final and lost 2–0.

References

1988 births
Living people
Dutch darts players
Sportspeople from Groningen (city)
Female darts players